Kronoberg County is a county or län in southern Sweden. Kronoberg is one of three counties in the province of Småland. It borders the counties of Skåne, Halland, Jönköping, Kalmar, and Blekinge. Its capital is the city of Växjö.

Province

Geographically, Kronoberg County is situated in the southern part of the province of Småland. It received its present borders in 1687 when Jönköping County was separated from the former Jönköping and Kronoberg County.

Administration 
The seat of residence for the Governor or landshövding is Växjö. The Governor is the head of the County Administrative Board or länsstyrelsen. The County Administrative Board is a Government Agency headed by a Governor. The current Governor is Kristina Alsér who took over the office from  Lars-Åke Lagrell.

Politics 
The County Council of Kronoberg or Landstinget Kronoberg.

Governors

Riksdag elections 
The table details all Riksdag election results of Kronoberg County since the unicameral era began in 1970. The blocs denote which party would support the Prime Minister or the lead opposition party towards the end of the elected parliament.

Municipalities 

Alvesta
Lessebo
Ljungby
Markaryd
Tingsryd
Uppvidinge
Växjö
Älmhult

Note that all the municipalities have names after their seats except Uppvidinge, where the seat is located in the small town Åseda.

Localities in order of size
The five most populous localities of Kronoberg County in 2020:

Demographics

Foreign background 
SCB have collected statistics on backgrounds of residents since 2002. These tables consist of all who have two foreign-born parents or are born abroad themselves. The chart lists election years and the last year on record alone.

Heraldry 
Kronoberg was formally granted its arms in 1944. However, use of the arms was already an established practice. It is a variation of the arms of Småland. 
Blazon: "In a field of gold on a green three tipped mountain, a red lion with blue armament stands upright, holding with both front paws a vertically aligned red crossbow with a black bow and arrow of silver."

References and notes

External links 
Kronoberg County Administrative Board
Kronoberg County Council 
Kronoberg Regional Association of Local Authorities
The Natural Fishing Fishing in South Eastern Sweden—tourism page
Book about Kronoberg Travel & Life in Kronoberg

 

Kronoberg County